Staniszcze Wielkie  is a village in the administrative district of Gmina Kolonowskie, within Strzelce County, Opole Voivodeship, in south-western Poland.

The village has a population of 1,169.

References

Villages in Strzelce County